Samuel Clemons (born October 10, 1978) is a former American football quarterback who played one season in the Arena Football League (AFL) with the Georgia Force and New York Dragons. He first enrolled at University of California, Berkeley before transferring to Western Illinois University. He attended Oak Ridge High School in El Dorado Hills, California. Clemons was also a member of the Dallas Cowboys, Chicago Rush, Dallas Desperados and Quad City Steamwheelers.

Early years
Clemons played high school football for the Oak Ridge High School Trojans. He completed 36 of 209 passes for 2,141 yards and 28 touchdowns with two interceptions his senior year. He earned Sierra Valley Conference Offensive Player of the Year honors in 1996. and earned first-team All-Metro honors. Clemons also lettered in basketball and baseball.

College career
Clemons played for the California Golden Bears from 1998 to 1999. He was redshirted in 1997. He transferred to play for the Western Illinois Leathernecks from 2000 to 2001. Clemons was the Gateway Football Conference leader in total offense in 2001.

Professional career
Clemons spent the 2002 off-season with the Dallas Cowboys of the National Football League. He was released by the Cowboys in August 2002. He signed with the AFL's Chicago Rush on November 20, 2003. Clemons was released by the Rush on January 19, 2005. On January 27, 2005, he was signed to the practice squad of the Dallas Desperados of the AFL. He was released by the Desperados April 4, 2005. Clemons played for the Quad City Steamwheelers of the af2 in 2005. He signed with the Georgia Force of the AFL on October 21, 2005. He was waived by the Force on March 6, 2006. Clemons was signed by the AFL's New York Dragons on March 15, 2006.

Personal life
Clemons was Adam Sandler's double during drop backs and passing scenes in The Longest Yard.

References

External links
Just Sports Stats
College stats

Living people
1978 births
American football quarterbacks
California Golden Bears football players
Western Illinois Leathernecks football players
Dallas Cowboys players
Chicago Rush players
Dallas Desperados players
Quad City Steamwheelers players
Georgia Force players
New York Dragons players
Players of American football from California
Sportspeople from Greater Sacramento
People from El Dorado Hills, California